Coccorchestes is a genus of South Pacific jumping spiders that was first described by Tamerlan Thorell in 1881.

Species
 it contains forty species, almost all occurring in Papua New Guinea, with one species found in Australia and one in New Britain:
Coccorchestes aiyura Balogh, 1980 – New Guinea
Coccorchestes biak Balogh, 1980 – New Guinea
Coccorchestes biroi Balogh, 1980 – New Guinea
Coccorchestes blendae Thorell, 1881 – New Guinea
Coccorchestes buszkoae Prószyński, 1971 – New Guinea
Coccorchestes clavifemur Balogh, 1979 – New Guinea
Coccorchestes fenicheli Balogh, 1980 – New Guinea
Coccorchestes ferreus Griswold, 1984 – Australia (Queensland)
Coccorchestes fluviatilis Balogh, 1980 – New Guinea
Coccorchestes giluwe Balogh, 1980 – New Guinea
Coccorchestes gressitti Balogh, 1979 – New Guinea
Coccorchestes hamatus Balogh, 1980 – New Guinea
Coccorchestes hastatus Balogh, 1980 – New Guinea
Coccorchestes huon Balogh, 1980 – New Guinea
Coccorchestes ifar Balogh, 1980 – New Guinea
Coccorchestes ildikoae Balogh, 1979 – New Guinea
Coccorchestes inermis Balogh, 1980 – Papua New Guinea (New Britain)
Coccorchestes jahilnickii Prószyński, 1971 – New Guinea
Coccorchestes jimmi Balogh, 1980 – New Guinea
Coccorchestes kaindi Balogh, 1980 – New Guinea
Coccorchestes karimui Balogh, 1980 – New Guinea
Coccorchestes mcadami Balogh, 1980 – New Guinea
Coccorchestes missim Balogh, 1980 – New Guinea
Coccorchestes otto Balogh, 1980 – New Guinea
Coccorchestes piora Balogh, 1980 – New Guinea
Coccorchestes quinquespinosus Balogh, 1980 – New Guinea
Coccorchestes rufipes Thorell, 1881 (type) – New Guinea
Coccorchestes sinofi Balogh, 1980 – New Guinea
Coccorchestes sirunki Balogh, 1980 – New Guinea
Coccorchestes staregai Prószyński, 1971 – New Guinea
Coccorchestes suspectus Balogh, 1980 – New Guinea
Coccorchestes szentivanyi Balogh, 1980 – New Guinea
Coccorchestes taeniatus Balogh, 1980 – New Guinea
Coccorchestes tapini Balogh, 1980 – New Guinea
Coccorchestes triplex Balogh, 1980 – New Guinea
Coccorchestes vanapa Balogh, 1980 – New Guinea
Coccorchestes verticillatus Balogh, 1980 – New Guinea
Coccorchestes vicinus Balogh, 1980 – New Guinea
Coccorchestes vogelkop Balogh, 1980 – New Guinea
Coccorchestes waris Balogh, 1980 – New Guinea

References

Arthropods of New Guinea
Salticidae
Salticidae genera
Spiders of Australia
Spiders of Oceania
Taxa named by Tamerlan Thorell